Cardiff Transport Interchange (or sometimes Cardiff Interchange or The Interchange) is a new bus and transport interchange, as well as offices and apartments, in the centre of Cardiff, the capital city of Wales. It has been under construction since 2020 and due for completion in Spring 2023. Once completed it will be run by the Welsh Government's transport arm, Transport for Wales.

Background

Cardiff Central bus station had originally been built, directly to the north of what is now Cardiff Central railway station, in 1954. The old terminus building was demolished in 2008 and, in 2010, options were put to the public for a multi-million pound bus station redevelopment or replacement. In 2014 a "Capital Square" masterplan for Central Square (the former bus station site) was revealed, led by developers Rightacres Property, including a new headquarters building for BBC Cymru Wales. The old bus station finally closed in August 2015. A replacement was expected to be completed by 2017, designed by Foster and Partners, on the site of the nearby Marland House and Wood Street NCP multi-storey carpark. As well as a new bus station it also included offices, shops and a hotel.

In 2016 the Marland House office block and the neighbouring NCP Wood Street multi-storey car park were demolished. It was planned to site the 'Central Transport Interchange' on this site, with walkways linking it to the railway station.

Foster and Partners were dropped from the project in 2018, after the Welsh Government took over responsibility from Cardiff Council, though by this point the architecture firm had completely redesigned the proposals.

Development

The Welsh Government bought the Marland House site from Cardiff Council for £12 million and carried out £3 million of preparatory work. In  April 2018 the new design for the 'Metro Central Interchange' was revealed, designed by local architects Holder Mathias Architects based on concepts by Foster and Partners. The Interchange would include a 14-stand bus station with a covered concourse and 500 cycle spaces. Once completed, the Interchange would be run by the Welsh Government's not-for-profit subsidiary, Transport for Wales, intended to bring together an integrated transport system.

In July 2019 it was announced that contracts had finally been signed between the Welsh Government, finance company Legal & General, and the developers Rightacres, to begin work constructing the scheme. Construction was expected to begin at the end of the year, after a major drain had been relocated.

Having previously built the adjacent BBC Cymru Wales New Broadcasting House and 2 Central Square, in December 2019 construction company ISG secured the £89 million contract to build the new Cardiff Transport Interchange. The Interchange would be funded by Legal & General. As well as the  covered 14-bay bus station, The Interchange was to include 318 rented apartments and about 90,000 sq ft of office accommodation.

In October 2020 Legal & General pledged £400 million of forward funding to build a new headquarters office building for its 2,000 staff, as part of the Interchange development.

See also
 List of tallest buildings in Cardiff

References

External links
 

Transport in Cardiff
Bus stations in Wales
Redevelopment projects in Cardiff
Transport infrastructure under construction